The Communauté d'agglomération Roissy Pays de France is a communauté d'agglomération in the Val-d'Oise and Seine-et-Marne départements and in the Île-de-France région of France. It was formed on 1 January 2016 by the merger of the former communauté d'agglomération Val de France, communauté d'agglomération Roissy Porte de France and 17 communes that were part of the Communauté de communes Plaines et Monts de France. Its seat is in Roissy-en-France. Its area is 340.9 km2. Its population was 354,451 in 2018, of which 2,858 in Roissy-en-France and 58,811 in Sarcelles, the largest commune of the communauté d'agglomération.

Composition
It consists of 42 communes:

Arnouville
Bonneuil-en-France
Bouqueval
Chennevières-lès-Louvres
Claye-Souilly
Compans
Dammartin-en-Goële
Écouen
Épiais-lès-Louvres
Fontenay-en-Parisis
Fosses
Garges-lès-Gonesse
Gonesse
Goussainville
Gressy
Juilly
Longperrier
Louvres
Marly-la-Ville
Mauregard
Le Mesnil-Amelot
Le Mesnil-Aubry
Mitry-Mory
Moussy-le-Neuf
Moussy-le-Vieux
Othis
Le Plessis-Gassot
Puiseux-en-France
Roissy-en-France
Rouvres
Saint-Mard
Saint-Witz
Sarcelles
Survilliers
Thieux
Le Thillay
Vaudherland
Vémars
Villeneuve-sous-Dammartin
Villeparisis
Villeron
Villiers-le-Bel

References 

Roissy Pays de France
Roissy Pays de France
Roissy Pays de France
States and territories established in 2016